Baron-Cohen or Baron Cohen is a Jewish surname.

Surnamed Baron Cohen
 Erran Baron Cohen (born 1968), a British composer and trumpet player and brother of Sacha Baron Cohen
 Sacha Baron Cohen (born 1971), a comedian and actor known for many characters including Ali G, Borat, Brüno, and "The Dictator".
 Simon Baron-Cohen (born 1958), a psychologist, and professor of developmental psychopathology (and cousin of Erran and Sacha Baron Cohen)
 Dan Baron Cohen (born 1957), a playwright and president of the International Drama in Education and the Arts (IDEA) World Congress; brother of Simon Baron-Cohen (and cousin of Erran and Sacha Baron Cohen)
 Ashley Baron Cohen (born 1967), known professionally as "Ash" without a surname; film director and another brother of Simon Baron-Cohen (and cousin of Erran and Sacha Baron Cohen)

See also
"Baron Cohen" can also refer to people surnamed Cohen who have been made a Baron. Such people include:
Lionel Cohen, Baron Cohen (1888–1973), a British judge and Lord Justice of Appeal made a life peer
Henry Cohen, 1st Baron Cohen of Birkenhead (1900–1977), a British physician, doctor and lecturer for whom the hereditary barony Baron Cohen of Birkenhead was created and on whose death it became extinct

Compound surnames
Jewish surnames
Kohenitic surnames
Yiddish-language surnames